Iong Cho Ieng (born 1 September 1973) is a football coach, currently managing Macau.

Managerial career
In 2005, Iong joined the coaching staff for the Macau national football team. In 2016, Iong was appointed head coach of the Macau's under-18 team. In April 2018, after serving as assistant under former managers Tam Iao San and Chan Hiu Ming, Iong was named manager of Macau.

References

1973 births
Living people
Macau football managers
Macau national football team managers
Association football coaches